A. A. Bakhrushin State Central Theatre Museum (abbreviated as SCTM. A. A. Bakhrushin, the Bakhrushin Museum, the former Literary-Theatrical Museum of the Imperial Academy of Sciences , also known as ГЦТМ им. А.А.Бахрушина) is a museum in Moscow dedicated to the theatre. It was founded in 1894 by the Russian merchant, and philanthropist .

The Great Soviet Encyclopedia characterises it as the largest theatre museum in the world.

History

In search of exhibits, Alexey Alexandrovich Bakhrushin repeatedly made long trips to Russia, from which he brought not only theatre rarities, but also works of folk art, furniture, and traditional Russian costumes.

In the early XX century Bakhrushin made three trips to improve the sections on the history of Western theatre. From abroad, he brought some personal belongings of the French actress Mars, a collection of Italian commedia dell'arte masks, and many rare musical instruments.

One of the main sources of enlargement of the museum's collection was through gifts. "Liegestuhle brethren," according to the antiquary M. M. Savostina, so liking the idea about the creation of the Bakhrushin theatre Museum, many "bezdarno and free of duty," sent him a present of rare photos, autographs, memorabilia. The inflow of gifts contributed to and gained considerable popularity in theatrical circles of Moscow "Cold Saturday." On the "light" was going to Bahrushina known actors and directors: it was visited by Alexander Yuzhin, Aleksandr Pavlovich Lensky, Maria Yermolova, Feodor Chaliapin, Leonid Sobinov, Konstantin Stanislavski, Vladimir Nemirovich-Danchenko. According to the tradition, they were not here empty-handed. Thus, the famous actress of the Maly theatre Glikeriya Fedotova gave Bakhrushin all her relics and gifts received during the years of stage life.

The museum's founding day  is considered to be 29 October 1894, when Bakhrushin first presented his collection for public inspection. In 1913, on November 25, the museum was transferred to the Academy of sciences with the condition of leaving it in Moscow, and in 1917 the museum was included in the network of state institutions, and in 1918 Alexei Bakhrushin — at the suggestion of Vladimir Lenin — was appointed the life director of the museum.

Until 1917, the museum was visited by about 300-400 people a year, then much more. By 1917, the museum had about twelve thousand exhibits. The museum funds were actively replenished in Soviet times, in 1949, they numbered 314 thousand units of storage, and in the 1990s-more than one million exhibits. Today the museum's collection includes more than one and a half million exhibits.

In 2014 The state theatre Museum named after him. A. A. Bakhrushin in connection with the 120th anniversary of the preservation of the history of the emergence and formation of domestic and foreign theatre was awarded the silver order of "Audience sympathy".

Museum 

The museum is located in the former manor house of A. A. Bakhrushin in Zamoskvorechye District. The main building, a one-storey mansion in English Gothic style, was built in 1896 by the architect Karl Hippius. The building was expanded  by the architect Ilya Bondarenko in 1937–38.

Archival and manuscript department 

The archive and manuscript department of the museum is a unique collection of documentary monuments to the history of the national theatre, from the 18th century to the present day. Here are kept the archives and manuscripts of prominent figures of Russian and world theatre, including Mikhail Shchepkin, Aleksandr Griboedov, Pavel Mochalov, Maria Yermolova, Vladimir Nemirovich-Danchenko, Feodor Chaliapin, Leonid Sobinov, Alexander Gorsky, Kasyan Goleizovsky, Alexey Verstovsky, Alexei Pisemsky, Pyotr Karatygin, and Nikolay Pomyalovsky.

Department of decorative and visual materials 

The museum's collection of decorative and pictorial materials consists of sketches of costumes and scenery; picturesque, graphic, and sculptural portraits of theatrical figures; images of theatre buildings, actors, and theatrical performances; cartoons and caricatures; and models of scenery.

Are creations of eminent artists working in the theatre: Pietro Gonzaga, Ivan Bilibin, N. Roerich, Fyodor Fedorovsky, Aleksandr Golovin, Mikhail Vrubel, Alexandre Benois, Léon Bakst, Konstantin Korovin, Boris Anisfeld, Aleksandra Ekster, Natalia Goncharova, Mstislav Dobuzhinsky, Robert Falk, Vladimir Tatlin, Alexander Tyshler, Boris Kustodiev, Konstantin Yuon, Nathan Altman, Aristarkh Lentulov, Yuri Annenkov, Nikolai Akimov, Sergei Eisenstein, Alexander Rodchenko, Pyotr Williams, Boris Messerer, Valery Levental, Eduard Kochergin and others.

Here are portraits of Karl Bryullov, Orest Kiprensky, Artur Fonvizin, Zinaida Serebryakova, etc.

Department of photo-negative documents 

The Department of photo-negative documents — the second largest in the museum — includes more than 500 thousand units of storage. These are photos of scenes from performances (drama, Opera, ballet, operetta); portraits of actors (in life and in roles), writers, playwrights, directors, artists, entrepreneurs and other theatre figures; group portraits; pictures of theatre buildings inside and outside. Described imperial theatres: Bolshoi Theatre, Mariinsky Theatre, Maly Theatre and Alexandrinsky Theatre, Moscow art theatre (Chekhov) and Moscow Art Theatre (as well as the Society of lovers of art and literature and Alexis circle), Studio Art theatre (1st, 2nd, 3rd, 4th), Habima Theatre, Zimin Opera, Moscow private Russian Opera Private Opera Mamontov; other pre-revolutionary private theatres and repertory: Korsh Theatre, entreprise Sukhodil'ski, in particular, provincial: Kharkov repertory company under the direction of N. Sinelnikov, Solovtsov theatre, Moscow Free theatre, the Soviet (State theate Vsevolod Meyerhold, Moscow chamber theatre) and modern theatres.
Among the most interesting and detailed "personal" collections — collection dedicated to the Maria Yermolova, Alexander Yuzhin, Glikeriya Fedotova, Osip Pravdin, Nadezhda Nikulina, Alexander Lensky; Mammoth Dalsky, Yury Yuriev, Pavel Orlenev, Catherine Roshchina-Insarova, Leonid Sobinov, Feodor Chaliapin, Antonina Nezhdanova, Nadezhda Obukhova, Anastasia Vyaltseva, Nadezhda Plevitskaya, Nikolai Monakhov, Nikolai Legat, Sergei Legat, Tamara Karsavina, Vaslav Nijinsky, Anna Pavlova, Mathilde Kschessinska, Olga Preobrazhenskaya, A. A. Gorsky, Mikhail Fokin, Olga Knipper-Chekhova, Vasily Kachalov, Ivan Moskvin, Alisa Koonen, Alexander Tairov, Alexander Rumnev, Mikhail Chekhov, Ivan Bersenev, Sofia Giatsintova, Maria Babanova, Lyudmila Tselikovskaya, Alla Tarasova, Olga Androvskaya, Mikhail Yanshin, Mark Prudkin, Nikolai Khmelyov, Maria Mironova, Andrei Mironov, Galina Ulanova, Maya Plisetskaya, Oleg Dahl, Yuri Bogatyryov, Innokenty Smoktunovsky, Mikhail Kozakov and many others, some foreign artists as Ernst von Possart, Eleonora Duse, Sarah Bernhardt.

Department of posters and programmes 

The Department of posters and programmes is the most extensive collection of the museum, it contains more than 600 thousand units. It is based on posters of the imperial and private theatres, collected by the founder of the museum, Alexei Alexandrovich Bakhrushin. Unique and extensive collection of posters of the pre-revolutionary province.

Decoration poster of the Fund were art posters and programmes made by famous artists: A. Y. Golovin, Ivan Bilibin, L. Bakst, K. Somov, S. Sudeikin, A. M. and V. M. Vasnetsova, artists of Russian avant-garde: H. A. and V. A. Stenberg, Nathan Altman, V. M. Khodasevich, Yu. p. Annenkov and others.

Department memorial Foundation glove 

The basis of the Department of the memorial and clothing Fund is a collection collected by the founder of the museum, A. A. Bakhrushin. Here are stored items related to theatrical themes, outstanding figures of Russian and foreign theatre, the main milestones of Russian theatretheatre history.

Video, sound and film Department 

It houses a unique collection of rare gramophone and long-playing records on Russian and foreign Opera music (about 11 thousand units), a collection of magnetic phonograms (about 16 thousand units.HR.), film and video materials, audio cassettes and CDs.

The basis of the museum collection of records is a collection donated to the museum in 1982 by the collector I. F. Boyarsky. This sounding chronicle of Russian and foreign Opera has more than 8 thousand records. It presents the first records of F. Chaliapin, L. Sobinov, D. Smirnov, L. Sibiryakova, A. Nezhdanova, N. Obukhova, N. Plevitskaya, Ivan Kozlovsky, Sergey Lemeshev, other artists of the "pre-revolutionary formation" — as well as great Italian singers - Enrico Caruso, Titta Ruffo, Mattia Battistini, Beniamino Gigli.

The formation of the collection of video materials began with the translation of rare film documents into video for the sake of their preservation. Among the materials that were primarily translated into video documents relating to the work of V. E. Meyerhold, K. S. Stanislavsky, A. ya. Tairov, S. I. mihoels; rare films relating to the life and work of the creators and artists of the Moscow art theatre; film materials about the activities of the Moscow art theatre-2, depicting one of the most outstanding actors of the Russian theatre Mikhail Chekhov; miraculously surviving footage with excerpts from performances of Chamber theatre, posed by A. Y. Tairov with the participation of A. G. Koonen and fragments of rehearsals and performances of the State Jewish theatre with the participation of Solomon Mikhoels.

Library (book Fund Department) 

The book collection of the museum is formed on the basis of the personal library of the museum founder, Alexey Alexandrovich Bakhrushin.

Department of children's and puppet theatre funds 

It is the youngest department in the museum. It was created on January 1, 2008, on the basis of the materials of the former state Museum of children's theatres, transferred to the SCTM. AA Bakhrushin on the orders of the Ministry of Culture (Russia) No. 1084 dated 6 August 2003 currently are working to reconcile the materials and putting them on record in state Central theatre Museum im. A. A. Bakhrushin.

The branches of the museum 

 
In addition to the main building, the state Central Theatre Museum named after A. A. Bakhrushin has nine branches. These are memorial houses and apartments of outstanding figures of the Russian theatre and exhibition hall:

 The house-Museum of Ostrovsky House-Museum Alexander Ostrovsky
 The house-Museum of Mikhail Shchepkin
 The house-Museum of Maria Yermolova
 The apartment-Museum of Vsevolod Meyerhold
 Museum-flat acting family Maria Mironov, Andrei Mironov — Alexander Menaker
 The Museum-apartment of Valentin Pluchek
 The Museum-flat of Galina Ulanova
 Memorial Museum "Creative workshop of a theatre artist David Borovsky"
 Theatrical gallery on Malaya Ordynka

Publishing 

Publishing Department the museum has produced a number of scientific and popular science publications, whose main goal — the promotion of the artistic heritage and scientific potential of the state Central theatre Museum im. A. A. Bakhrushin, as well as a reflection of the modern exhibition and exhibition activities of all structural units of the museum.

Excursions 

The museum and its branches organise sightseeing and thematic tours for students, schoolchildren, foreign delegations, tourists and other categories of visitors.

 Sightseeing tour " treasures of Bakhrushin Museum»
 Sightseeing tour "the A. A. Bakhrushin theatre and its Museum»
 Thematic tour " Versailles on a Hook. The architectural image of the house. Theatre rarities»
 Thematic tour " what the portraits are talking about»
 Thematic tour for children "We go to the theatre»
 Thematic tour for children " history of ballet shoes»
 Thematic tour "the Secret of the knight of Zamoskvoretsky castle" "the secret of the knight of the castle of Zamoskvorech" (in a foreign language)»
 Walking tour " Zamoskvorechye Bakhrushin. Cold places in the tanners»

References

External links
 
 
 Bakhrushin Museum on the website museum.ru
 Bakhrushin Museum on the website russianmuseums.info
 Bakhrushin Museum on the Portal of cultural heritage of Russia
 Bakhrushin Museum on the Branch portal " Archives of Russia»
 Virtual tours of the Bakhrushin Museum halls 
 Bakhrushin Museum was awarded the order of «Audience sympathy»
 Guide to the collections of the archive and manuscript Department of the Bakhrushin Museum

Museums in Moscow
Museums established in 1894
Theatre museums
Art museums and galleries in Moscow
Cultural heritage monuments of federal significance in Moscow
Tourist attractions in Moscow